The United Nama Independence People's Party was a short-lived political party in Namibia. It was founded in August 1964 on the basis of the Independence and National Convention Party. The party ceased to function in early 1965.

Political parties established in 1964
Political parties disestablished in 1965
Nama people
Defunct political parties in Namibia